Nawab Sayyid Murtaza Ali Khan Bahadur, MBE (22 November 1926 – 29 January 1982) was the titular Nawab of Rampur from 1966 to his death in 1982, succeeding his father, Nawab Raza Ali Khan Bahadur.

Early life

Sayyid Murtaza Ali Khan Bahadur was born on 22 November 1926 at the Rafat Mahal, Khasbagh Palace in Rampur, the eldest son of Shia Nawabzada (Crown Prince) Raza Ali Khan Bahadur. At the time, Murtaza's grandfather Hamid Ali Khan Bahadur was the Nawab. Upon his grandfather's death in 1930, Murtaza's father became Nawab of Rampur and Murtaza became the heir apparent. He was educated at the Doon School in Dehradun, then at Wellington College in Britain and at St.Stephen's College in New Delhi. In 1943, Murtaza was commissioned into the British Indian Army and served as an aide-de-camp to the Commander-in-Chief, India, General (later Field-Marshal) Sir Claude Auchinleck. He was promoted to Captain in 1946 and in that year was made the Brigadier of the Rampur State Forces. Also that year, Murtaza was appointed an MBE.

From 1946 until Independence, Murtaza served as the Minister of the Army for Rampur State and as the Minister for the Household, Education and Public Works until 1949, when Rampur State formally merged with the Dominion of India.

Titular Nawab of Rampur

Following the death of his father in 1966, Murtaza succeeded as titular Nawab of Rampur. 

From 1969 until 1971, he served as a member in the Uttar Pradesh legislative assembly, as well as an MP in the Lok Sabha. It is an interesting historical fact that Murtaza Ali contested an election from Rampur opposite his own mother Rafat Jamani Begum in 1972 and won. In 1971, the Indira Gandhi regime stripped Nawab Murtaza and his fellow former rulers of what little rights they had left, formally ending Nawab Murtaza's standing as a monarch.

Personal life

In 1946, Nawab Murtaza married Her Highness Nawab Aftab Dulhan Sakina uz-Zamani Begum Sahiba of Pirpur (11 September 1928 – 3 August 1994), the daughter of a minor chieftain. The couple had a son and a daughter.

Nawab Mohammed Ali Khan (born 19 August 1948) is the eldest son of the late Nawab Murtaza. He has since married and is now blessed with two children, which consist of a son and a daughter, namely Nawabzadi Zahra Ali Khan (born 5 August 1999) and Nawabzada Akbar Ali Khan (born 27 November 2001).

Last years

From 1966 to 1975, Nawab Murtaza served as President of the Raza Rampur Library Trust. He became a vice-chairman on its board of trustees in 1975 and remained in that capacity until his death on 29 January 1982 after a 16-year reign, aged 56.

Titles

1926-1931: Nawabzada Sayyid Murtaza Ali Khan
1931-1943: Nawabzada Sayyid Murtaza Ali Khan, Wali Ahad Bahadur
1944-1946: Lieutenant Nawabzada Sayyid Murtaza Ali Khan, Wali Ahad Bahadur
1946-1966: Brigadier Nawabzada Sayyid Murtaza Ali Khan, Wali Ahad Bahadur, MBE
1966-1982: Brigadier His Highness 'Ali Jah, Farzand-i-Dilpazir-i-Daulat-i-Inglishia, Mukhlis ud-Daula, Nasir ul-Mulk, Amir ul-Umara, Nawab Sayyid Murtaza 'Ali Khan Bahadur, Mustaid Jang, Nawab of Rampur, MBE

Honours

(ribbon bar, as it would look today)

Order of Hamid of Rampur (Nishan-i-Hamidiya), 1st Class
Order of Good Fortune of Rampur (Nishan-i-Iqbal), 1st Class
1939-1945 Star-1945
War Medal 1939-1945-1945
India Service Medal-1945
Member of the Order of the British Empire (MBE)-1946

References

20th-century Indian Muslims
Nawabs of Rampur
Indian people of Pashtun descent
Uttar Pradesh politicians
1926 births
1982 deaths
Members of the Order of the British Empire
Indian Shia Muslims
St. Stephen's College, Delhi alumni
The Doon School alumni
People educated at Wellington College, Berkshire
People from Rampur, Uttar Pradesh